Karen Chin is an American paleontologist and taphonomist who is considered one of the world's leading experts in coprolites.

Biography
Chin loved studying living things as a child, and enjoyed memorizing the names of species that she read about. As a college student, she worked as a nature interpreter for the National Park Service.

When Chin was in graduate school at Montana State University, studying modern grasslands, she took a job at the Museum of the Rockies. There Chin worked with Jack Horner and preparing fossils from the Two Medicine Formation for study. She began by slicing newly unearthed maiasaura bones for Horner to study with a microscope. Among the fossil were eggs and nests and unusual "blobs" that had not yet been identified. Chin asked to be the one to study these fossils and her research would confirm her hypothesis that they were coprolites.

This experience was so positive that Chin says it gave her "fossil fever" and she turned her attention to studying fossils.

She notes that due to her gender and racial identity, she is unusual in her field, saying:

Chin is a professor at the University of Colorado, Boulder, and Curator of Paleontology at the University of Colorado Museum of Natural History.

Selected publications
 Chin, Karen; Feldmann, Rodney M.; Tashman, Jessica N. "Consumption of crustaceans by megaherbivorous dinosaurs: dietary flexibility and dinosaur life history strategies". Scientific Reports. 7.
 Chin, K., Hartman, J.H., and Roth, B. 2009. Opportunistic exploitation of dinosaur dung: fossil snails in coprolites from the Upper Cretaceous Two Medicine Formation of Montana. Lethaia 42: 185–198. 
 Chin, K., Bloch, J.D., Sweet, A.R., Tweet, J.S., Eberle, J.J., Cumbaa, S.L., Witkowski, J., and Harwood, D.M. 2008. Life in a temperate polar sea: a unique taphonomic window on the structure of a Late Cretaceous Arctic marine ecosystem. Proceedings of the Royal Society B 275: 2675–2685.
 Tweet, J.S., Chin, K., Braman, D.R., and Murphy, N.L. 2008. Probable gut contents within a specimen of Brachylophosaurus canadensis (Dinosauria: Hadrosauridae) from the Upper Cretaceous Judith River Formation of Montana. PALAIOS 23: 625–636. 
 Chin, K. 2007. The paleobiological implications of herbivorous dinosaur coprolites from the Upper Cretaceous Two Medicine Formation of Montana: why eat wood? Palaios 22: 554–566. 
 Chin, K., and Bishop, J. 2007. Exploited twice: bored bone in a theropod coprolite from the Jurassic Morrison Formation of Utah, U.S. In: Bromley, R.G., Buatois, L.A., Mángano, M.G., Genise, J.F., and Melchor, R.N. [eds.], Sediment-Organism Interactions: A Multifaceted Ichnology. SEPM Special Publications, v. 88, pp. 377–385. 
 Chin, K., Tokaryk, T.T., Erickson, G.M., Calk, L.C., 1998, A king-sized theropod coprolite, Nature v. 393, pp. 680–682.

References

American paleontologists
Women paleontologists
Living people
20th-century births
Date of birth missing (living people)
Taphonomists
Year of birth missing (living people)
American people of Chinese descent
African-American scientists
21st-century African-American people
20th-century African-American people